Edwin Towler was an English professional footballer who played as a goalkeeper. He played 23 matches in the Football League Second Division for Burnley between 1902 and 1904.

References

English footballers
Association football goalkeepers
Burnley F.C. players
English Football League players
Year of death missing
Year of birth missing